Compañeros is the second album by the British jazz dance band Working Week, released by Virgin Records in 1986.

Track listing
 "Too Much Time" (Don Van Vliet) – 4:01
 "Dancing in Motion" (Simon Booth, Juliet Roberts, Larry Stabbins) – 4:10
 "Friend (Touche Pas à Mon Pote)" (Booth, Stabbins) – 4:44
 "South Africa" (Booth, Stabbins) – 4:53
 "Shot in the Dark" (Booth, Roberts, Stabbins) – 4:54
 "Soul Train" (Booth, Stabbins) – 4:45
 "King of the Night" (Booth, Stabbins) – 5:20
 "Touching Heaven" (Booth, Roberts, Stabbins) – 4:11
 "Southern Cross" (Booth, Stabbins) – 7:58

Personnel
Working Week
 Juliet Roberts – vocals
 Simon Booth – guitars
 Larry Stabbins – tenor and soprano saxophone and flute
with:
 Paul Spong – trumpet
 Richard Edwards – trombone
 Jess Bailey – keyboards
 Nick Graham – keyboards
 Iain Prince – keyboards
 Paul "Tubbs" Williams – bass
 Jeff Clyne – double bass
 Preston Heyman – drums
 Nic France – drums
 Frank Ricotti – percussion
 Bosco De Oliveira – percussion
 Tom Morley – drum programming
 Juliet Roberts, Wayne Hernandez, Angela Barfon, Candi Mackenzie, Michael Paul – backing vocals
 David Bedford – string arrangements

Charts

Album charts

References

1986 albums
Working Week albums
Virgin Records albums